The 2016–17 Algerian Women's League Cup is the 1st season of the Algerian Women's League Cup. The competition is open to all Algerian Women's clubs participating in the Algerian Women's Championship. ASE Alger Centre wins the cup beating AS Sûreté Nationale in the final match played in Ahmed Zabana Stadium, Oran.

Tournament

Round of 16

|}

Quarter-finals

|}

Semi-finals

|}

Final

|}

References

External links
Coupe de la Ligue 2016-17 - Ligue du Football Féminin official website

Algerian Women's League Cup